The 2011 Segunda División play-offs took place in June 2011. This was Segunda's first season with purely promotion play-offs since 1986–87 and the first time playoffs had been used for movement between the first and second tier since 1998–99. This new promotion phase (known as ) was introduced to determine the third team which promoted to 2011–12 La Liga. Teams placed between 3rd and 6th position, excluding reserve teams, took part in the promotion play-offs.

Fifth placed faced against the fourth, while the sixth positioned team faced against the third. In case of a tied eliminatory there were extra time, once finished it, penalty shoot-out determined the winner. The first leg of the semifinals were played on 12 June, and the second leg on 15 June at home of the best positioned team. The first leg of the semifinals was played on 8–9 June 2011 with the best positioned team playing at home on the second leg which was played on 11–12 June 2011. The final was also two-legged, with the first leg on 15 June 2011 and the second leg on 18 June 2011 with the best positioned team also playing at home on the second leg. Elche CF and Granada CF played the final phase where Granada CF promoted to La Liga for the first time in 35 years, having spent 26 of them in Segunda División B and Tercera División. Celta de Vigo and Real Valladolid were eliminated in semifinals. Barcelona B could not participate in the play-offs as they are Barcelona's reserve team.

Road to the Promotions play-offs

League table

Elche CF
Elche CF was the second team together with Celta de Vigo to be qualified to this phase after the win of Rayo Vallecano by 3-0 against Xerez CD on 22 May 2011. Elche at the time was the Segunda División team with most consecutive seasons. They made a regular season until 1 March, when this spring the team started to get into a run: 10 wins, 4 draws and 2 defeats, 34 points out of 48. Finally  the team ended in 4th place after Granada CF's draw and their victory 4-1 in the last game against Xerez CD (a team which still had options to qualify if Real Valladolid lost their game with AD Alcorcón), so being the best positioned they played the second legs at home. Elche's last participation in La Liga was in 1988–89, having spent 19 seasons: from 1959 until 1978 except a hiatus in 1971–73 and briefly in 1984–85 and 1988–89. Elche was 23rd in the All-Time La Liga table. They were in Segunda División since the 1999–2000 season.

Background at 2010–11 Segunda División:

Granada CF
Granada CF was the first team to be qualified to this phase after winning against Villarreal B 3-0 in Los Cármenes on 20 May 2011. Granada, a team which was promoted from the Segunda División B previous season after being 22 years in lower levels, made a spectacular season in the regular league having made a brilliant second round where most of the last matchdays was the best positioned team for the play-offs places. Finally the team ended up in 5th position after drawing 0-0 in the last game against Recreativo de Huelva. Granada's last participation in La Liga was in 1975–76, having spent 17 seasons: 1941–45, 1957–61, 1966–67 and the largest period in 1968–1976. Granada was 26th in the All-Time La Liga table. This was their first season in Segunda División for 22 years.

Background at 2010–11 Segunda División:

Celta de Vigo
Celta de Vigo was the second team together with Elche CF to be qualified to this phase thanks to a 2-2 draw against Elche on 21 May 2011 and after the win of Rayo Vallecano by 3-0 against Xerez CD the next day. Celta de Vigo is a historical La Liga team which was known as "EuroCelta" about ten years ago thanks to their achievements in European competitions: 7-0 over S.L. Benfica, 4-0 over Juventus F.C., one good participation in the UEFA Champions League winning in San Siro over A.C. Milan, and in 2006–07 at UEFA Cup reaching round of 16, however that season the team was relegated from La Liga to Segunda División and fell into a crisis. They made a very good 2010–11 Segunda División season fighting between Real Betis and Rayo Vallecano for the direct promotion, being 1st or 2nd some matchdays and by 28 February they had only lost two matches. But as opposed to what happened with Elche CF, results since March were ominous for Celta: 2 wins, 7 draws and 7 defeats, 13 points out of 48. Thanks to the previous good results, some draws and the win over Albacete Balompié they remained in play-off places. Finally the team ended up in 6th position after winning 3-0 in the last game against FC Cartagena. Celta's last participation in La Liga was in 2006–07, having spent 46 seasons: from 1939–1959 except 1944–45, 1969–75, briefly in 1976–77, 1978–79, 1982–83 and 1985–86, 1987–90 and a golden era between 1992–2007 except the 2004–05 season. Celta de Vigo was 12th in the All-Time La Liga table. They were in Segunda División since their relegation from La Liga in 2007.

Background at 2010–11 Segunda División:

Real Valladolid
Real Valladolid was the last team to qualify to this phase, they did so in the last game by winning 2-0 against AD Alcorcón on 4 June 2011. Real Valladolid, a historical La Liga team, they were relegated from La Liga last season, in the last match Valladolid was a FC Barcelona victim, a match that Barça needed a win to get the league championship. They made an irregular 2010–11 Segunda División season: in the early 12 matchdays they played good and were in play-off places, however they began a losing streak which almost touched the relegation zone, but since matchday 24 they started to escalate positions again. They lost the penultimate match against SD Huesca (when a point was enough to qualify) and their play-off position was in danger if they lost and Xerez defeated Elche, but they won the last game. Valladolid's last participation in La Liga was in 2009–10, having spent 40 seasons: from 1948–1964 except 1958–59 and 1961–62, 1980–2004 except 1992–93 season and lately 2007–2010. Valladolid was 13th in the All-Time La Liga table. They were in Segunda División only since this season.

Background at 2010–11 Segunda División:

Promotion play-offs

Semifinals

First leg

Second leg

Final

First leg

Second leg

References

2010–11
play-offs
1